Democrazy is a 2003 vinyl-only double EP of demos by Damon Albarn, frontman of British rock band Blur and the animated group Gorillaz. It was released through Honest Jon's record label.

Background
Albarn recorded these songs, which are little more than demos, during the US leg of Blur's tour for Think Tank in various hotel rooms.  He then decided to issue the result, on 8 December that year, in a double 10" vinyl set on his Honest Jon's label. On 22 December Albarn showcased the demos at a live gig in London's Neighbourhood club.  One of the songs, "I Need a Gun", was extended and performed as "Dirty Harry" by Gorillaz on their album Demon Days. The track "A Rappy Song" has often been mis-labeled as an unnamed Gorillaz' track featuring Bootie Brown and Cee-Lo Green, however the song is little more than a remix made by a fan.

The songs on Democrazy are very sketchy, and some of the songs are unfinished in the way that they simply end by turning off the sound completely.

Critical reception

The EP received mixed-to-negative reviews from music critics. At Metacritic, which assigns a normalized rating out of 100 to reviews from critics, the album received an average score of 45, which indicates "mixed or average reviews", based on 9 reviews. Alexis Petridis of The Guardian described the album as "occasionally brilliant and frequently irritating beyond belief" and wrote: "It is packed with interesting ideas, but is founded in an appalling self-importance." Mark Beaumont of NME panned the album, describing it as "the half conceived, cottonmouthed rubbish." Pitchfork Media critic Jedediah Gilchrist stated: "He's already recorded such a wealth of great material that no mystique remains, leaving no real reason for anyone—including the most dedicated fan—to seek out these poorly produced musical shreds." Scott of Stylus Magazine wrote: "Serving as nothing more than a temporary diversion or side note to his fully realised work, this is worth a cursory listen for the insight alone."

Track listing

Disc one
 "I Need a Gun"  - 1:25
 "Reedz" - 1:22
 "Half a Song" - 1:06
 "Five Star Life" - 2:45
 "A Rappy Song" - 1:40
 "Back to Mali" - 1:04
 "I Miss You" - 2:21
 "Hymn to Moon" - 1:01

Disc two
 "Dezert" - 2:51
 "Sub Species of an American Day" - 2:25
 "American Welfare Poem" - 3:06
 "Saz Theory Book" - 2:35
 "Gotta' Get Down With the Passing of Time" - 2:17
 "End of Democrazy" - 3:39

References

External links
 

Demo albums
Damon Albarn EPs
Songs written by Damon Albarn
2003 debut EPs